Euphaedra acuta, the acute pink forester, is a butterfly in the family Nymphalidae. It is found in south-eastern Nigeria, western Cameroon and the Democratic Republic of the Congo (Ubangi). The habitat consists of forests.

References

Butterflies described in 1977
acuta